Wilhelm Schulze (10 December 1920, Leipzig – 30 December 2002) was a German professor of veterinary medicine and director of the University of Veterinary Medicine Hanover (1966–68, 1978–80 and 1980-81) who specialized in pigs.

Schulze studied veterinary medicine at Leipzig University and at Hanover University, and became a professor (1950–56) and dean (1952–55) in Leipzig. In 1957 he was appointed a professor in Hanover and established a highly regarded clinic specializing in pigs.

In 1968 he was a founder of the International Pig Veterinary Society (IPVS). His dedication to his favoured species earned him the nickname "Pigs-Schulze" ("Schweine-Schulze") among students, colleagues and vets.

Schulze was awarded honorary degrees of the Free University of Berlin, the University of Veterinary Medicine Vienna, the University of Warsaw and Leipzig University.

On August 24, 2006, the university decided to posthumously name a prize after him.

Experiments
Between 1974 and 1978 Schulze and his colleagues carried out a study at the University of Veterinary Medicine Hanover. The study, published as ‘Attempts to Objectify Pain and Consciousness in Conventional (captive bolt pistol stunning) and Ritual (knife) Methods of Slaughtering Sheep and Calves'  is reported on Islamic websites to have concluded that "the Islamic way of slaughtering is the most humane method of slaughter and that captive bolt stunning, practiced in the West, causes severe pain to the animal".

According to the study: "these experiments on sheep and calves carried out within a clinic show that during a ritual slaughter, carried out according to the state of the art using hydraulically operated tilting equipment and a ritual cut, pain and suffering to the extent as has since long been generally associated in public with this kind of slaughter cannot be registered."
However, the published account of the study notes that the "objective results presented for the captive bolt application in sheep (..) rather (..) indicates that the captive bolt device used is suspect" and that these initial "scientific findings and the results presented are only a very first contribution" and that they "need to be followed as a high priority by further investigations in the continuation of the scientific clarification of the issues of loss of pain and consciousness during slaughter of this kind with and without stunning using the same experimental approach with a representative number of grown cows of various breeds."

Notes

German veterinarians
1920 births
2002 deaths
Leipzig University alumni
Academic staff of Leipzig University
Officers Crosses of the Order of Merit of the Federal Republic of Germany